Anna Maria Zdunik is a Polish mathematician. She specializes in dynamical systems, and is a professor at the University of Warsaw.

Education
Zdunik earned her habilitation in 2002, on the basis of an evaluation of her achievements and her dissertation.

Career
She became a professor of mathematics in 2010.

She was invited as a speaker for the 2015 Fields Medal Symposium.

She is the Chair of the Faculty of Mathematics, Informatics and Mechanics of the University of Warsaw (MIMUW). The Warsaw Center of Mathematics and Computer Science (Warszawskie Centrum Nauk Matematycznych) is a project of both MIMUW and the Institute of Mathematics of the Polish Academy of Sciences (IMPAN); the Center is run by an Executive Committee that includes Zdunik.

Selected publications
  1991
  2004
  2007
  2012
  2016
  2020
  2022

References

Polish mathematicians
Polish women mathematicians
Women mathematicians
Year of birth missing (living people)
Living people